The politics of Tianjin is structured in a dual party-government system like all other governing institutions in the mainland of the People's Republic of China (PRC).

The Mayor of Tianjin is the highest-ranking official in the People's Government of Tianjin. Since Tianjin is a direct-administered municipality, the mayor occupies the same level in the order of precedence as provincial governors. However, in the city's dual party-government governing system, the mayor has less power than the Tianjin Chinese Communist Party Municipal Committee Secretary, colloquially termed the "Tianjin CCP Party Chief".

List of Secretaries of the Tianjin Communist Party Committee

List of the Chairmen of Tianjin People's Congress 
Yan Dakai (阎达开): June 1980－April 1983
Zhang Zaiwang (张再旺): April 1983－May 1988
Wu Zhen (吴振): May 1988－June 1993
Nie Bichu (聂璧初): June 1993－May 1998
Zhang Lichang: May 1998－January 2003
Fang Fengyou (房凤友): January 2003－January 2006
Liu Shengyu (刘胜玉): January 2006－January 2011
Xiao Huaiyuan (肖怀远): January 2011－January 2018
Duan Chunhua (段春华): January 2018－January 2023
Yu Yunlin (喻云林): January 2023－present

List of the Mayors of Tianjin
Huang Jing (黄敬): January 1949-August 1952
Wu De (吴德): October 1952-January 1955
Huang Huoqing(黄火青): January 1955-June 1958
Li Gengtao (李耕涛): June 1958-September 1963
Hu Zhaoheng (胡昭衡): September 1963 – 1966
Xie Xuegong (解学恭): December 1967-June 1978
Lin Hujia (林乎加): June 1978-October 1978
Chen Weida (陈伟达): October 1978-June 1980
Hu Qili (胡启立): June 1980-April 1982
Li Ruihuan(李瑞环): May 1982-November 1989
Nie Bichu (聂璧初): November 1989-June 1993
Zhang Lichang (张立昌): June 1993-May 1998
Li Shenglin (李盛霖): May 1998-December 2002
Dai Xianglong (戴相龙): December 2002- December 2007
Huang Xingguo (黄兴国): December 2007- September 2016
Wang Dongfeng (王东峰): September 2016 - October 2017
Zhang Guoqing (张国清): January 2018 – September 2020
Liao Guoxun (廖国勋): September 2020 – April 2022
Zhang Gong (张工): May 2022 – present

List of the Chairmen of Tianjin CPPCC Tianjin Committee
Huang Huoqing (黄火青): March 1955－March 1960
Wan Xiaotang (万晓塘): March 1960－September 1966
Xie Xuegong (解学恭): December 1977－July 1979
Yan Dakai (阎达开): July 1979－June 1980
Huang Zhigang (黄志刚): June 1980－April 1983
Chen Bing (陈冰): April 1983－April 1987
Wu Zhen (吴振): April 1987－May 1988
Tan Shaowen: May 1988－April 1990
Liu Jinfeng (刘晋峰): April 1990－May 1998
Fang Fengyou (房凤友): May 1998－January 2003
Song Pingshun (宋平顺): January 2003－June 2007
Xing Yuanmin (邢元敏): January 2008－January 2013
He Lifeng: January 2013－May 2014
Zang Xianfu (臧献甫): May 2014－March 2018
Sheng Maolin (盛茂林): March 2018－January 2023
Wang Changsong (王常松): January 2023－present

List of the Chairmen of Tianjin Supervisory Committee 

 Deng Xiuming (邓修明): January 2018－November 2021
 Chen Fukuan (陈辐宽): November 2021－present

Culture in Tianjin
Tianjin
Tianjin